Burdwan Raj College, established in 1881, is the oldest state-governed college in Purba Bardhaman district catering to the district and neighboring areas of Bankura district, Purulia district, Hooghly district and Birbhum district. It offers undergraduate courses in arts, commerce and sciences and a post-graduate course in Bengali. It is affiliated to University of Burdwan.

History
In 1817, Maharaj Tej Chand established an Anglo-vernacular school in his palace at Burdwan. In 1854, Maharaja Mahatab Chand extended and renamed the school "High English School". In 1881, when Aftab Chand became the Maharaja of Burdwan, he shifted the school to Natunganj and introduced Liberal Arts courses in accordance with the permission of the University of Calcutta. The school became named as "Raj Collegiate School" and the college "Burdwan Raj College". This chief educational institution of Burdwan is entirely supported out of the maharaja's estate.
 
The royal patronage of Burdwan Raj College was taken over by the government of West Bengal in 1956 under the sponsoring scheme, and its necessary parting from the University of Calcutta became effective. Burdwan Raj College was affiliated to the University of Burdwan in 1960.

Mrityunjay Sil was the officer-in-charge. He served from 1991 to 1993 and made Burdwan Raj College rise to new heights — it was the number 1 college of West Bengal at that time and 21st at the All-India Level.

Shifts
Morning: Undergraduate General course classes for Arts, Commerce, Science
Honours classes for Hindi, Music and Education Honours.

Day: Undergraduate General and Honours course classes for Arts and Science.

Evening: Undergraduate General and Honours course classes for Commerce.

Departments

Science

Chemistry
Physics
Mathematics
Botany
Zoology
Statistics
Electronics
Economics
Geography
Computer Science

Arts and Commerce
Bengali
English
Sanskrit
Hindi
History
Geography
Political Science
Philosophy
Sociology
Economics
Commerce
M.A. (Bengali)
Education
Music

BBA & BCA

Admission
Admission to the first-year undergraduate classes are usually held after the publication of the result of the Higher Secondary Examination under the West Bengal Council of Higher Secondary Education in May/June every year and is based strictly on merit through open counseling procedure.

Accreditation
The college is recognized by the University Grants Commission (UGC). It is accredited by the National Assessment and Accreditation Council (NAAC), and awarded B++ grade in 2016.

Alumni
Ekramuddin Ahmad, Bengali litterateur

See also

References

External links
Burdwan Raj College 
Online Admission

Colleges affiliated to University of Burdwan
Educational institutions established in 1881
Universities and colleges in Purba Bardhaman district
1881 establishments in India